1947 Országos Bajnokság I (men's water polo) was the 41st water polo championship in Hungary. There were twelve teams who played one-round match for the title.

Final list 

* M: Matches W: Win D: Drawn L: Lost G+: Goals earned G-: Goals got P: Point

2. Class 
1. KaSE 14, 2. Neményi MADISZ 13, 3. MTE 13, 4. Tatabányai SC 12, 5. BEAC 6, 6. Cegléd 6, 7. Postás 4, 8. VAC 2, 9. MÁVAG 0 point. A BEAC-Postás match result was fail.

Sources 
Gyarmati Dezső: Aranykor (Hérodotosz Könyvkiadó és Értékesítő Bt., Budapest, 2002.)

1947 in water polo
1947 in Hungarian sport
Seasons in Hungarian water polo competitions